The 1936 Major League Baseball All-Star Game was the fourth playing of the mid-summer classic between the all-stars of the American League (AL) and National League (NL), the two leagues comprising Major League Baseball. The game was held on July 7, 1936, at National League Park in Boston, Massachusetts, the home of the Boston Bees of the National League.  The game resulted in the National League defeating the American League 4–3. It was the National League's first win in All-Star Game history.

Rosters
Players in italics have since been inducted into the National Baseball Hall of Fame.

American League

National League

Game

Umpires

The umpires rotated positions clockwise in the middle of the fifth inning, with Summers moving behind the plate.

Starting lineups

Game summary

Joe DiMaggio became the first rookie to play in an All-Star Game; he was hitless in five-at-bats and made an error in right field.

References

External links
Baseball Almanac
Baseball-Reference
Photo of 1936 American League stars via Cool Old Photos blog
1936 All Star Game Complete Radio Broadcast (Linus Travers and Fred Hoey) via YouTube

Major League Baseball All-Star Game
Major League Baseball All-Star Game
Baseball competitions in Boston
Major League Baseball All-Star Game
July 1936 sports events
1930s in Boston